Paula Nicart Mejías (born 8 September 1994) is a Spanish former footballer who played as a defender.

International career
Nicart made her debut with Spain at a friendly match against Belgium, a 2–1 win in San Pedro del Pinatar on 11 February 2015. She came on as a substitute for teammate Ivana Andrés in the 86th minute.

Personal life
Nicart is a medical student.

References

External links
 
 

1994 births
Living people
Spanish women's footballers
Primera División (women) players
Spain women's international footballers
Valencia CF Femenino players
People from Cornellà de Llobregat
Sportspeople from the Province of Barcelona
Footballers from Catalonia
Women's association football defenders
CE Sant Gabriel players
Sportswomen from Catalonia
FC Barcelona Femení B players
FC Levante Las Planas players
Sevilla FC (women) players
UEFA Women's Euro 2017 players
Spain women's youth international footballers
21st-century Spanish women